Novales is a municipality located in the province of Huesca, Aragon, Spain. According to the 2004 census (INE), the municipality has a population of 191 inhabitants. It is situated on a plain on the right bank of the river Guatizalema, about 16 km Southeast of Huesca.

Geography

Bordering localities 
 Albero Alto
 Argavieso
 Sesa

History 
Novales was first mentioned on 4 December 1097 in reference to Señor "Fortunio Garcez de Balle in Novales"

Cultural heritage
The following buildings are part of the architectural heritage of Novales: the Castillo de Novales, the church Iglesia de Nuestra Señora del Rosario and the hermitage Ermita de San Joaquín.

Polítics

Mayors
As of 2016, the mayor has come from the Partido Aragonés over the past 13 years.

Election results

Debt 
The concept of the current debt considers debt with savings and banks relative to crediting institutions, fixed-income securities and loans or credit transfers to third parties, excluding commercial debt.

The municipal debt per inhabitant in 2014 was €0  after a peak of €66 in 2008.

Demographics 
The municipality extends over an area of 20 km2, and has 176 inhabitants per the municipal population statistics of the Instituto Nacional de Estadística de España at a density of 8.76 inhabitants/km2.

Notable people
Domingo Catalán, a street is named after the 6 time world champion in athletics, e.g.in 1987 and 1988 100 km World Championship.

References

External links
 

Municipalities in the Province of Huesca